"Medicate" is a song by the American rock band AFI, released as the first single from their 2009 album Crash Love. It was released as a music download through iTunes on August 25, 2009, and made its radio airplay premiere on September 1. It reached #7 on Billboard's Alternative Songs chart and #16 on the Rock Songs chart. As part of its promotion the song was included as a playable track in the video games Guitar Hero 5 and Tap Tap Revenge 3, and added as downloadable content to the Rock Band music store.

Music video 
The music video for "Medicate" was directed by Paul Minor and premiered  October 2, 2009. The video is shot in black and white, with gold color effects added digitally. The video depicts the band performing the song in front of a large projection screen which shows footage of a blonde girl and of the band. During the song's bridge, singer Davey Havok kisses the girl while guitarist Jade Puget lies bleeding on the floor, his blood colored gold through the use of digital effects. This style is very similar to conception of Paco Rabanne's and Fendi advertisements.

Chart positions

References

2009 singles
AFI (band) songs
2009 songs
Interscope Records singles
Songs written by Hunter Burgan
Songs written by Adam Carson
Songs written by Davey Havok
Songs written by Jade Puget